Francesca Di Lorenzo was the defending champion, but lost in the quarterfinals to Robin Anderson.

Anderson went on to win the title, defeating Jang Su-jeong in the final, 6–2, 6–4.

Seeds

Draw

Finals

Top half

Bottom half

References

External Links
Main Draw

Tevlin Women's Challenger - Singles